Nitrosyl bromide, is the chemical compound with the chemical formula NOBr. It is a red gas with a condensing point just below room temperature.

Nitrosyl bromide can be formed by the reversible reaction of nitric oxide with bromine. This reaction is of interest as it is one of very few third-order homogeneous gas reactions. NOBr is prone to photodisassociation at standard pressure and temperature.

2 NO + Br2 ⇌ 2 NOBr

External links

Bromide
Nitrogen oxohalides
Oxobromides
Gases with color